The Stechford rail crash occurred on 28 February 1967 at Stechford railway station in the area of Stechford in Birmingham, England.

A Class 24 diesel locomotive had arrived at Stechford sidings with a ballast train. This was due to return to Nuneaton and so the locomotive needed to be run round the train. There were too many wagons for the runaround loop to be used, so the Head Shunter decided to run the locomotive around via the main line. This was a movement that was only to be made in an emergency, and even then only with permission from the signalman at Birmingham New Street signal box.

The Head Shunter did not seek such permission and when his hand signal for the guard was misunderstood by the secondman, the locomotive moved on to the main line just as a Manchester-Coventry four-carriage Class 304 electric unit no.026 was approaching. It collided with the locomotive at about 60 mph, killing the driver and eight passengers. In addition, 16 people were injured.

References

Sources

External links
 Official accident report at the Railways Archive
 Another page with a description of the accident

Railway accidents and incidents in Warwickshire
Rail transport in Birmingham, West Midlands
History of Birmingham, West Midlands
Railway accidents in 1967
1967 disasters in the United Kingdom
1967 in England
20th century in Warwickshire
Disasters in the West Midlands (county)
Accidents and incidents involving British Rail
February 1967 events in the United Kingdom